South Preston is a rural locality in the local government area (LGA) of Central Coast in the North-west and west LGA region of Tasmania. The 2016 census recorded a population of 7 for the state suburb of South Preston.

History 
South Preston was gazetted as a locality in 1965.

Geography
The Leven River forms most of the western boundary.

Road infrastructure 
Route C125 (South Preston Road) passes through from north to south-east.

References

Towns in Tasmania
Localities of Central Coast Council (Tasmania)